Engelhardia is a genus of seven species of trees in the family Juglandaceae, native to southeast Asia from northern India east to Taiwan, Indonesia and the Philippines. The genus name is commonly misspelled "Engelhardtia", a "correction" made by the original author Carl Ludwig Blume in 1829 and persistent until today, as it was thus entered in the Index Kewensis; the original spelling is Engelhardia.

Fossil record
Engelhardia pollen has been found in deposits of Miocene Age in Denmark. †Engelhardia orsbergensis leaf fossils have been uncovered from rhyodacite tuff of Lower Miocene age in Southern Slovakia near the town of Lučenec. †Engelhardia orsbergensis and †Engelhardia macroptera fossils have been uncovered from late Miocene strata in Iceland.

Species
Engelhardia apoensis Elmer ex Nagel, native to Malaya, Borneo, the Philippines
Engelhardia cathayensis Dode
Engelhardia hainanensis Chen, native to China
Engelhardia nudiflora Hook. f.
Engelhardia rigida Blume, native to Java, Borneo, New Guinea, the Philippines
Engelhardia roxburghiana Wall. (syn. E. chrysolepis Hance, E. fenzelii Merr.) huang qi in Chinese
Engelhardia serrata Blume, native to southwest China, Indochina, Indonesia, and the Philippines
Engelhardia serrata var. cambodica W. E. Manning
Engelhardia spicata Lesch ex Blume, native to Nepal, southern Asia, the Philippines, and New Guinea
Engelhardia spicata var. integra (Kurz) W.E. Manning ex Steen., Fl. Males. I, 6: 953 (1972); Grierson & Long, Notes Roy. Bot. Gard. Edinburgh 40: 133. (1982), isonym; syn. var. colebrookiana (Lindl.) Koorders & Valeton
Engelhardia ursina

References

External links
Flora of China: Engelhardia

 
Engelhardioideae
Fagales genera